Fair City is an Irish television soap opera first broadcast on RTÉ One in 1989. The following is a list of characters who currently appear in the programme and a list of former characters, listed in order of first appearance. Some characters have been recast since their first appearance.

Present characters

Past characters
The following characters departed Carrigstown.

Deceased characters

Celebrity cameos
The following famous faces have appeared in Fair City. Reg E. Cathey has expressed a wish to appear in Fair City, as has Verity Rushworth.

References

External links
 Character profiles at RTÉ.ie

Fair City
Fair City characters
Fair City